Great Lakes Theater, originally known as the Great Lakes Shakespeare Festival, is a professional classic theater company in Cleveland, Ohio, United States. Founded in 1962, Great Lakes is the second-largest regional theater in Northeast Ohio.  It specializes in large-cast classic plays with a strong foundation in the works of Shakespeare and features an educational outreach program. The company performs its main stage productions in rotating repertory at the Hanna Theatre in Playhouse Square, which reopened on September 20, 2008.  The organization shares a resident company of artists with the Idaho Shakespeare Festival.  On its main stage and through its education programs, GLT connects approximately 85,000 adults and students to the classics each season.

GLT's artistic directors have included Arthur Lithgow, Lawrence Carra, Vincent Dowling, Gerald Freedman, James Bundy and Charles Fee.

Origins

A professional regional theater, The Great Lakes Shakespeare Festival (GLTF), was launched in 1962 with a $50,000 budget. Driven and supported by community members and volunteers at its inception, the theater continues to operate as a non-profit with a $3.6 million annual operations budget.

Later to become the first GLTF director, Arthur Lithgow directed Shakespeare Under the Stars, a professional summer theater troupe at Antioch College where he was a faculty member. Between 1952 and 1957, the troupe performed all of Shakespeare’s plays and began traveling across Northeastern Ohio to perform at Stan Hywet Hall in Akron, at an old movie theater in Cuyahoga Falls, and at the Toledo Zoo. By 1962, the troupe was seeking a space to perform permanently while, simultaneously, a group of citizens led by the Lakewood Board of Education president, Dorothy Teare, were seeking cultural activities to occupy the Lakewood Civic Auditorium during the summer months. Thus, the Great Lakes Shakespeare Festival formed and premiered the first production, As You Like It, on July 11, 1962. It continued at the Lakewood Civic Auditorium that season and performed six of Shakespeare plays in rotation.

Notable moments 
While the theater began staging Shakespeare productions exclusively, the repertoire expanded to other theatrical classics beginning in 1965. Eventually, to better capture that scope, the name was changed to Great Lakes Theater Festival (GLTF) in 1985.

In 1982, the GLTF moved from Lakewood to the Ohio Theater in Cleveland to become the first resident company in Playhouse Square, an historic district home to several 1920s venues. On September 20, 2008, GLTF relocated again to the newly renovated Hanna Theater, which is a 1921 building also located in Playhouse Square. An extensive fundraising campaign ($19.2 million) enabled renovations that maintained the Hanna's historic interiors but updated staging mechanisms as well as reducing seating to accommodate 550 audience members. Having raised $14.7 million independently, final funding assistance came from a matching grant from the Kresge Foundation as well as donations from Tom Hanks, who had interned at the theater in 1977-1979. In addition to financial contributions, Hanks also raised funding through his performance of "Tom Hanks at the Hanna," which earned him the honorary title: chair of the campaign. The theater reached its goals for the renovation as well as securing an endowment that would support operations in years to come.

In 2005, the GLTF won the Northern Ohio Live Magazine Award for Excellence in Theater and in 2006 won The Free Times Readers Choice Award for Best Performing Arts Group. Further accolades include the prestige as one of two Cleveland theaters, alongside the Cleveland Play House, with membership in the League of Resident Theaters, a designation that makes Cleveland only one of 11 US cities with that acclaim.

"Festival" was eliminated from the title in 2011 to better reflect its September through May season and programming format. Having staged over 300 productions, the theater celebrated its 50th season in 2011-2012 and commemorated the milestone with a gala hosted at the InterContinental Hotel & Conference Center in April 2012.

Notable alumni 

One of the most well-known alumni of the GLTF is Tom Hanks, who went on to become an Academy Award winning actor. Having worked with the theater in the summers of 1977-1979 as an intern and core company member, Hanks credits that time for teaching him to act. Other Academy Award-winning alumni include Olympia Dukakis, recognized for her performance in the film Moonstruck (1987), Ruby Dee who won for her performance in the film American Gangster (2007), and Cloris Leachman best known for her roles in The Facts of Life and the Mary Tyler Moore Show. The theater's reputation and strong artistic direction attracted talented actors across the years. In 1994, years after she played opposite Paul Newman in The Hustler (1961), Piper Laurie performed Lyuba Ranevsky in the GLTF production of The Cherry Orchard. Jean Stapleton, who played Edith Bunker in the comedy series All in the Family, performed on the GLTF stage in 1986 (Arsenic and Old Lace). Hal Holbrook  collaborated with Gerald Freedman, artistic director, on King Lear (1990), Uncle Vanya (1991), and Death of a Salesman (1994). Holbrook is best known for his award-winning one man show Mark Twain Tonight. Additionally, the theater lists among its alumni actors who went on to play famously known television and film characters, such as Major Frank Burns of MASH performed by alum Larry Linville and Freddy Krueger played by former GLTF actor Robert Englund. Several actors returned to GLTC for performances even after achieving fame. For example, paying tribute to his father, Arthur Lithgow the first GLTC director, John Lithgow performed a tribute show titled "Stories by Heart" in 2010. Lithgow is known for his television roles in Third Rock from the Sun and Dexter, as well as film appearances in the World According to Garp and Terms of Endearment. Directors who gained experience at the theater include George Abbott among others.

Artistic directors 

Arthur Lithgow, father of John Lithgow, was the founding artistic director and remained in that role until 1966. Alongside Dorothy Teare, Lithgow established a strong orientation to educational programming for local schools delivered through student matinees as well as classroom partnerships, subsidized in part by the Cleveland Foundation.

Lawrence Carra, a drama professor at Carnegie Mellon University, was the artistic director between 1966 and 1975, during which time he directed a contemporary production of Hamlet based on the shooting of Robert Kennedy.

During Vincent Dowling's tenure from 1976 to 1985, the company  moved from its Lakewood Civic Auditorium home to the Ohio Theatre of the Playhouse Square Center in 1982. Dowling had been a veteran actor of the Dublin Abbey Theater prior to taking on this post and was quoted as saying that his primary goal was to provide a drama diet for the Ohio community.

Gerald Freedman became the artistic director in 1985 and left in 1997 when the board required that the director be in residence year round. Increasing the theater's prestige, Freedman successfully attracted well-known actors and directors to the GLTF stage, including: George Abbott, Jean Stapleton, Hal Holbrook, and Ruby Dee. Under his direction, GLSF changed its name to the "Great Lakes Theater Festival.

Freedman was followed by James Bundy in 1998. James Bundy was the artistic director between 1998 and 2002 when he left to become the Dean of the Yale School of Drama and artistic director of Yale Repertory Theater. During Bundy's direction the theater realized its most attended season to date in 2001, with 77,000 audience attendees.

Charles Fee has been the artistic director since 2002. Under Fee's direction, the theater began partnerships with the Idaho Shakespeare Festival, Lake Tahoe Shakespeare Festival, and the Playhouse Square Foundation. Fee inherited more than $1 million in debt, but by making savvy decisions, such as becoming a summer-fall repertory theater, he has put the organization in strong financial standing.

Educational outreach  

The theater began as a citizen-led endeavor to support community cultural engagement and maintains educational outreach as central to its mission today. Approximately 50,000 students in Northeast Ohio engage with the theater each year through student matinee series, school residency programs, surround programs (programs and workshops about productions,) writing contests, summer camps, and free community programming.

References

External links
 Great Lakes Theater Home page
 Great Lakes Theater History
 Great Lakes Theater: A Detailed History
Great Lakes Theater Company Records, Kent State University Archives

Shakespeare festivals in the United States
Culture of Cleveland
League of Resident Theatres
Arts organizations established in 1961
Tourist attractions in Cleveland
Theatre companies in Ohio
1962 establishments in Ohio